This is a list of notable bands considered to be beatdown hardcore. Beatdown hardcore (also known as toughguy hardcore, heavy hardcore, moshcore, and brutal hardcore) is a subgenre of hardcore punk that incorporates more music elements of heavy metal than traditional hardcore punk.

All Out War
Big Cheese
Biohazard
Breakdown
Broken Teeth
Carnivore
Code Orange
Death Before Dishonor
Deez Nuts
Earth Crisis
The Flex
Hatebreed
Judge
Knocked Loose
Knuckledust
Killing Time
Kublai Khan
Lionheart
Malevolence
Madball
Merauder
Ringworm
Sheer Terror
Sick of It All
Speed
Sworn Enemy
Terror
Varials
Vein.fm
World of Pain
Xibalba

References

Heavy hardcore
Lists of hardcore punk bands